The Fiat Talento is a light commercial vehicle produced by the Italian automaker Fiat, first sold in 1981. It is offered in two non consecutive generations.
First generation (1989–1993): short wheelbase version of the Fiat Ducato.
Second generation (2016–2020): rebadged variant of the Renault Trafic. Sold from July 2016.

References

Talento
Vans
Vehicles introduced in 1989
Vehicles introduced in 2016
1980s cars
1990s cars
2010s cars